A Folk Set Apart is a compilation album by American musician Cass McCombs. It was released in December 2015 under Domino Records.

Track listing

References

2015 albums
Cass McCombs albums
Domino Recording Company albums